The Arén Formation or Arén Sandstone (Catalan: Calcàries i gresos d’Areny) is a geological formation in the Tremp-Graus Basin around Arén, Catalonia, Spain whose strata date back to the Late Cretaceous. Dinosaur remains are among the fossils that have been recovered from the formation. The formation dates to the Campanian to Maastrichtian and underlies the Tremp Group.

Fossil content

Dinosaurs 

Dinosaur eggs (Megaloolithus baghensis, Sankofa pyrenaica), sauropod tracks, unnamed  sauropod remains, theropod tracks, euornithopod tracks, and an unnamed iguanodont remains present in Lérida Province.

See also 
 List of dinosaur-bearing rock formations

References

Bibliography

Further reading 

 N. López Martínez. 2000. Eggshell sites from the Cretaceous-Tertiary transition in south-central Pyrenees (Spain). In A. M. Bravo & T. Reyes (ed.), First International Symposium on Dinosaur Eggs and Babies, Extended Abstracts 95-115
 P. M. Sander, C. Peitz, J. Gallemi and R. Cousin. 1998. Dinosaurs nesting on a red beach?. Comptes Rendus de l'Académie des Sciences de Paris: Sciences de la Terre et des Planètes 327:67-74
 J. Gallemi, R. Martinez, and J. M. Pons. 1983. Coniacian-Maastrichtian of the Tremp Area (South Central Pyrenees). Newsletters on Stratigraphy 12(1):1-17
  A. Liebau. 1973. El Maastrichtiense lagunar ("Garumniense") de Isona [The lagoonal Maastrichtian ("Garumnian") of Isona]. XIII Coloquio Europeo de Micropaleontología 87-112
 J. Rosell. 1967. Estudio geológico del sector del prepirineo comprendido entre los ríos Segre y Noguera Ribagorzana (Provincia de Lérida) [Geological study of the pre-Pyrenean sector between the Segre and Noguera Ribagorzana rivers (Lérida province)]. Pirineos 21(75–78):5-225
 A. F. d. Lapparent and E. Aguirre. 1956. Algunos yacimientos de Dinosaurios en el Cretácico Superior de la Cuenca de Tremp [Some dinosaur localities in the Upper Cretaceous of the Termp Basin]. Estudios Geológicos 12(31/32):377-382

Geologic formations of Spain
Upper Cretaceous Series of Europe
Cretaceous Spain
Campanian Stage
Maastrichtian Stage
Sandstone formations
Limestone formations
Deltaic deposits
Lacustrine deposits
Ichnofossiliferous formations
Ooliferous formations
Fossiliferous stratigraphic units of Europe
Paleontology in Spain